Ubisoft+ (formerly Uplay+) is a subscription-based video game service from Ubisoft offering access to download and play games from Ubisoft's library for a single monthly fee. Ubisoft+ offers subscribers unlimited access to a catalog of more than 100 games on Microsoft Windows PCs, including titles such as Assassin's Creed Valhalla, Watch Dogs: Legion and Immortals Fenyx Rising. Ubisoft+ also includes premium editions to games, classic titles and additional content packs. With a Ubisoft+ subscription, games can be downloaded and played on Windows computers using the free Ubisoft Connect game launcher.

History 
Ubisoft announced the new subscription service at E3 2019. The service, then called Uplay+, launched on September 3, 2019, for Windows.

In October 2020, Uplay+ rebranded to Ubisoft+ and announced its service expansion to cloud gaming platforms Amazon Luna and Google Stadia for US subscribers in November 2020 and December 2020, respectively. New releases were added including Watch Dogs: Legion in October 2020, Assassin's Creed Valhalla in November 2020 and Immortals Fenyx Rising in December 2020.

Ubisoft also announced its plans to bring Ubisoft+ to PlayStation consoles and was made available in May-June 2022 as part of the revamped PlayStation Plus subscription service with Ubisoft+ Classics on the Extra and Premium tiers. Ubisoft plans to bring Ubisoft+ to Xbox consoles later in 2022.

References

External links
 

Cloud gaming
Online video game services
Online-only retailers of video games
Subscription video game services
Ubisoft